Jaroslav Matoušek (born 7 April 1951) is a Czech sprinter. He competed in the men's 100 metres at the 1972 Summer Olympics.

References

External links
 

1951 births
Living people
Athletes (track and field) at the 1972 Summer Olympics
Czech male sprinters
Olympic athletes of Czechoslovakia
People from Trutnov
Sportspeople from the Hradec Králové Region